Honey Creek, Wisconsin, may refer to:

Honey Creek, Sauk County, Wisconsin, a town in Sauk County
Honey Creek, Walworth County, Wisconsin, an unincorporated community